Motive is a Canadian police procedural drama television series that aired for four seasons on the CTV television network from February 3, 2013, to August 30, 2016.

Series overview

Episodes

Season 1 (2013)

Season 2 (2014)

Season 3 (2015)

Season 4 (2016)

References

External links 
 
 Motive at USA Network
 

Lists of Canadian drama television series episodes
Lists of crime drama television series episodes
Lists of crime television series episodes